The 1956 Ole Miss Rebels football team represented the University of Mississippi during the 1956 NCAA University Division football season. The Rebels were led by 10th-year head coach Johnny Vaught and played their home games at Hemingway Stadium in Oxford, Mississippi (and alternate site home games in Jackson, Mississippi and Memphis, Tennessee). They competed as members of the Southeastern Conference, finishing in fourth with a record of 7–3 (4–2 SEC). They were not invited to a bowl game.

Schedule

Roster
FB Paige Cothren, Sr.

References

Ole Miss
Ole Miss Rebels football seasons
Ole Miss Rebels football